Karin Lenzke (born 27 July 1936) is a German athlete. She competed in the women's high jump at the 1960 Summer Olympics.

References

1936 births
Living people
Athletes (track and field) at the 1960 Summer Olympics
German female high jumpers
Olympic athletes of the United Team of Germany
Place of birth missing (living people)